Miguel Angel López was an El Salvador-American soccer defender who played one season in the North American Soccer League and earned one cap with the U.S. national team.

López graduated from San Gabriel High School and attended Whittier College, playing on the men’s soccer team.

López played with the Los Angeles Aztecs of the North American Soccer League in 1976.  He earned his cap in a 3-0 loss to Mexico on September 27, 1977.  Don Droege replaced him in the 62nd minute.  López also played for South Bay United and United Armenians, both of the Greater Los Angeles Soccer League.  He also played for the Los Angeles Skyhawks in the American Soccer League.

References

1953 births
Living people
American soccer players
North American Soccer League (1968–1984) players
Salvadoran emigrants to the United States
Los Angeles Aztecs players
Los Angeles Skyhawks players
United States men's international soccer players
Association football defenders
Whittier Poets men's soccer players
People from Santa Tecla, El Salvador
People from San Gabriel, California
Soccer players from California
Sportspeople from Los Angeles County, California